A list of French-produced films scheduled for release in 2017.

Films

Notes

External links
 French films of 2017 at the Internet Movie Database
 2017 in France
 2017 in French television

French
2017
Films